Sueno's Stone is a Picto-Scottish Class III standing stone on the north-easterly edge of Forres in Moray and is the largest surviving Pictish style cross-slab stone of its type in Scotland, standing  in height. It is situated on a raised bank on a now isolated section of the former road to Findhorn. The stone is named after Sweyn Forkbeard, but this association has been challenged and it has also been associated with the killing of King Dubh mac Ailpin in Forres in 966. The stone was erected  but by whom and for what, is unknown.

Possible second pillar
Evidence from Timothy Pont's Mapp of Murray, the more modern military maps of Roy and Ainslie (1750 and 1789 respectively) and Robert Campbell's map of 1790 all show Sueno's Stone along with another stone that has now disappeared. The fact that Pont's map shows the standing stones at all indicates their size as Pont does not show any other obelisks anywhere. Ainslie has inscribed on his map "two curiously carved pillars". The fact that these maps show the pillar(s) in their present (at least approximate) position belies the notion that it was found elsewhere and re-erected at its present location. 

James Ray, who fought on the British government side during the Jacobite rising of 1745, describes seeing a single stone as the government army marched past the area, just days prior to the Battle of Culloden.

Hector Boece (not known entirely for his historical accuracy) mentions the stone and attributes it to Sueno.   Lady Ann Campbell, the Countess of Moray, is noted in the early 18th century as carrying out maintenance on the stone in an attempt to stabilise it. This was achieved by constructing stepped plinths around the base and these are what can be seen today. Archaeological excavations carried out in 1990 and 1991 suggest that it may originally have been one of two monumental stones.

Description

Sueno's Stone is an upright cross-slab with typical Pictish style interwoven knotwork on the edge panels. It is carved from local yellow sandstone which is prevalent in Moray but has suffered considerable weathering in places. The west face has a carved Celtic cross with elaborately interlaced decoration and a poorly preserved figural scene (perhaps a royal inauguration) set in a panel below the cross. The east face has four panels that show a large battle scene. The top panel is quite weathered and shows rows of horsemen. The second panel depicts armed foot soldiers and the third panel shows the decapitated vanquished soldiers, the heads piled up, and soldiers, archers and horsemen surrounding what may be a broch. The base panel depicts the victorious army leaving the battlefield. The sides are also elaborately carved. In the early 1990s, the stone was encased in armoured glass to prevent further erosion.

Interpretations

Radiocarbon dating at the site produced dates of charcoal fragments to between AD 600 and AD 1000. Two separate but similar patterns were discerned and may relate to the second stone. The examination of the carvings has been carried out to compare the style and also to interpret the figurative and historical significance. The Irish crosses of the 10th century are similar with their interweaving patterns and crowded panels of figures. One hypothesis is that the figures depicted in the battle, parade and decapitation scenes is the army of Kenneth MacAlpin (Cináed mac Ailpín), the scene being the representation of Kenneth's demonstration of his military and legal authority over northern Pictland. The two side panels have sinuous vine patterns populated with men as depicted in the Book of Kells. This suggests a date of between AD 800 and AD 900. The traditional interpretation of the battle scene was that it shows a victory by Malcolm II (Máel Coluim mac Cináeda) (reigned 1005–1034) against Danes or Norse led by one Sueno. This appears in Alexander Gordon's Itinerarium Septentrionale of 1726 and is thought to have been ancient then, derived from folklore and the more learned histories of John of Fordun, Hector Boece and George Buchanan. However, this interpretation is no longer supported by historians and archaeologists.

Several more recent interpretations have been advanced. Anthony Jackson suggested that the stone displayed the final triumph of the Christian Gaels of Dál Riata over their (erroneously) , Pictish enemies, in which case it would have been erected by Kenneth MacAlpin or his immediate successors. As an alternative, Archie Duncan advances his theory that the stone records the defeat, death and reburial of Dubh mac Ailpin in 966.

A modified form of Jackson's theory, stripped of much of the ingenious interpretation, is probably the present orthodoxy. This holds that Sueno's Stone commemorates an unknown victory by the men of Alba, the Gaelicised Picts of the lands south of the Mounth over the men of Moray, those of the lands north of the Mounth.

Legend
Local legend says this was the crossroads where Macbeth originally met the three witches. In the legend, they were eventually imprisoned inside the stone and should the stone be broken they would be released. However, this tale can date no further back than Shakespeare's play.

Another legend suggests that the stone was erected for King Dubh mac Ailpin. The Annals of Ulster reported "Dub mac Maíl Coluim (mac Ailpin), king of Alba, was killed by the Scots themselves"; the usual way of reporting a death in internal strife, and place the death in 966. It has been suggested that Sueno's Stone, near Forres, may be a monument to Dub, erected by his brother Kenneth II (Cináed mac Maíl Coluim). It is presumed that Dub was killed or driven out by Cuilén, who became king after Dub's death, or by his supporters.

Notes

References
 Duncan, A.A.M., The Kingship of the Scots 842–1292: Succession and Independence. Edinburgh University Press, Edinburgh, 2002. 
 Foster, Sally M., Picts, Gaels and Scots: Early Historic Scotland. Batsford, London, 2004. 
 Henderson, George & Isabel Henderson, The Art of the Picts: Sculpture and Metalwork in Early Medieval Scotland Thames & Hudson, London, 2004. 
 Historic Environment Scotland, Statement of Significance: Sueno's Stone, Edinburgh, 2015
 Jackson, Anthony, "Further Thoughts on Sueno's Stone" in W.D.H. Sellar (ed.) Moray: Province and People. The Scottish Society for Northern Studies, Edinburgh, 1993. 
 Oram, Richard., Moray & Badenoch, A Historical Guide, Edinburgh, 1996.  
 Sellar, W.D.H., "Sueno's Stone and its Interpreters" in W.D.H. Sellar (ed.) Moray: Province and People, The Scottish Society for Northern Studies, Edinburgh, 1993.

External links

9th-century sculptures
10th-century sculptures
Buildings and structures completed in the 9th century
Buildings and structures completed in the 10th century
Culture of medieval Scotland
Monuments and memorials in Scotland
Outdoor sculptures in Scotland
Pictish stones
Archaeology of Scotland
Scheduled Ancient Monuments in Moray
Tourist attractions in Scotland
Forres